Strathmoor Village is a home rule-class city in Jefferson County, Kentucky, United States. The population was 648 at the 2010 census.

Geography
Strathmoor Village is located in central Jefferson County at  (38.220197, -85.678399). It is bordered to the southwest by Strathmoor Manor, to the east by Kingsley, to the north by Seneca Gardens, and otherwise by Louisville.

U.S. Route 150 (Bardstown Road) forms the southwest border of the city, and Kentucky Route 155 (Taylorsville Road) forms the northern border.

History

Strathmoor Village was incorporated in 1928.

Strathmoor Village annexed the city of Strathmoor Gardens in 1993.

Demographics

As of the census of 2000, there were 625 people, 261 households, and 176 families residing in the city. The racial makeup of the city was 96.16% White, 1.44% African American, 1.28% Asian, 0.48% from other races, and 0.64% from two or more races. Hispanic or Latino of any race were 0.16% of the population.

There were 261 households, out of which 33.0% had children under the age of 18 living with them, 56.3% were married couples living together, 9.6% had a female householder with no husband present, and 32.2% were non-families. 27.6% of all households were made up of individuals, and 12.3% had someone living alone who was 65 years of age or older. The average household size was 2.39 and the average family size was 2.96.

In the city, the population was spread out, with 22.6% under the age of 18, 5.6% from 18 to 24, 28.6% from 25 to 44, 28.6% from 45 to 64, and 14.6% who were 65 years of age or older. The median age was 41 years. For every 100 females, there were 88.8 males. For every 100 females age 18 and over, there were 84.7 males.

The median income for a household in the city was $64,375, and the median income for a family was $73,438. Males had a median income of $47,656 versus $37,891 for females. The per capita income for the city was $30,370. None of the families and 0.8% of the population were living below the poverty line, including no under 18s and 2.5% of those over 64.

References

External links
 City of Strathmoor Village official site

Cities in Kentucky
Cities in Jefferson County, Kentucky
Louisville metropolitan area
Populated places established in 1928
1928 establishments in Kentucky